The 2010/11 FIS Nordic Combined World Cup was the 28th world cup season, a combination of ski jumping and cross-country skiing organized by FIS. It started on 26 November 2010 in Kuusamo, Finland and ended on 12 March 2011 in Lahti, Finland.

Calendar

Men

Team

Standings

Overall 

Standings after 13 events.

Nations Cup 

Standings after 15 events.

Notes

References

External links
FIS-Ski Home Nordic Combined - Official Web Site

FIS Nordic Combined World Cup, 2010-11
FIS Nordic Combined World Cup, 2010-11
FIS Nordic Combined World Cup